Judith Margolis (born September 24, 1944) is an Israel-based American artist working visually in paintings, drawings, artist's books and multi-media collages. In her art and writing she "explores tensions between consciousness, feminism, and religious ritual tradition".

Early life
Margolis was born into a Jewish family and Yiddish-speaking community in the Bronx, NY. In 1948 her family moved to suburban New Jersey, from which the adolescent Margolis would adventure to New York City for her early artistic education.

Early artistic training 
Margolis began her artistic training during high school at age 15 with a drawing class at The Art Students League, then attended Cooper Union, where she met her first husband Albie Tabackman.  The two traveled across the United States to California, where they lived at Magic Forest Farm in Oregon. Margolis also studied at Lone Mountain College in San Francisco, and has an MFA (1986) from the University of Southern California.

Travels 
Margolis led an Orthodox Jewish life in San Francisco, Los Angeles and Israel before leaving the orthodoxy. And for the last 10 years, since leaving Orthodoxy, she has been slowly finding a balance between everything she has gained from her religious life and a retrieval of the freedoms that she believes are important for her art.

Career 
Since 1996, Margolis has been the Art Editor of Nashim: The Journal of Jewish Women's Studies and Gender Issues, published by Indiana University Press.

She was selected as one of ten international Common Ground artists.

Margolis is Creative Director of Bright Idea Books, which produces limited edition and artist's books.

Margolis wrote and illustrated the prayer book Life Support; Invitation to Prayer.

In 2015 she was co-curator for the Jerusalem Biennale, presenting the Women of the Book exhibition in which women artists offered their own interpretations of the weekly divisions of the bible.

Education 
 MFA from University of Southern California, 1986
 BA from Lone Mountain College, SF, CA 1977
 Two years study at Cooper Union, NY, 1962–64
 Additional studies Columbia University, NY

Notable works 
Life Support: Invitation to Prayer, Penn State University Press (2019)

Countdown to Perfection:Meditations on the Sefirot. Limited edition fine art unbound book contained in an individual, linen clad, oyster box.  (2009)

The Underground Dreams of a Cactus, Limited edition hand painted etching, mono-print cover. (1983)

Family 
Judith's second husband, the author David Margolis, died on July 17, 2005. She has three children and six grandchildren.

Exhibitions

One person exhibitions 
 Hebrew Union College, New York, New York . 2009
 Hebrew Union College, Los Angeles, California . 2008
 University of Southern California, Los Angeles, California . 2003
 Yeshiva University Museum, New York, New York . 2002
 Brandeis Bardin Institute . Simi Valley, California . 2000
 Talpiot Industrial Gallery . Jerusalem . 1994
 ARTernatives Gallery . San Luis Obispo, California . 1989
 University Of Southern California . Los Angeles . 1986
 Buffalo Street Gallery . Ithaca, New York . 1988
 Smedley's Gallery . Ithaca, New York . 1981
 Eisenhower College Gallery . Seneca Falls, New York . 1978
 Ithaca House Gallery . Ithaca, New York . 1978
 Cole/Hayes Gallery . San Francisco . 1977

Two person exhibitions 
 University of Judaism (now the American Jewish University) / Platt Gallery . Los Angeles . (scheduled) 1999
 Ithaca House Gallery . Ithaca, New York . 1981

Selected group exhibitions 

 Women of the Book First Station, Jerusalem, Israel (2015)
Jerusalem Biennial 2015
 “Gathering Sparks,” (2014) Mizel Museum, Denver, CO
“Find Common Ground” (2008) Huan Tie Art Museum, Beijing China
Anlasslich des 125. Geburtstages von Hermann Hesse” (2002) KunstKeller Gallery, Annaberg, German
Florida Atlantic University. Boca Raton, Florida. 2000
 University of Arizona Museum of Art. Tucson, Arizona. 2000
 Kutztown University Gallery. 1999
 Plains Art Museum. Fargo, North Dakota. 1998
 Morris Louis Gallery/Bezelel. Jerusalem. 1998
 B'nai B'rith National Jewish Museum. Washington, District of Columbia . 1997
 Central Exhibition Hall. Moscow. 1996
 Kerim Institute, Jerusalem. 1996
 Kanner Heritage Museum. Toronto, Canada. 1996
 Skirball Cultural Center. Los Angeles. 1996
 Navon Gallery. Neve Ilan, Israel. 1995
 Plotkin Judaica Museum. Phoenix, Arizona. 1995
 The Knesset. Jerusalem. 1994
 Arad Art Museum. Arad, Israel. 1994
 Yeshiva University Museum. NYC. 1993
 Perkins Gallery. Boston. 1993
 Dubin-Wolf Exhibit Center. Los Angeles. 1992
 Loyola University Laband Gallery. Los Angeles. 1991
 UCLA Kirkham Gallery  Los Angeles. 1991
Aishet Chayil (traveled between 1990 and 1998), opened at Yeshiva University Museum NYC and closed at Bezalel Gallery, Jerusalem, Israel.
 Dubin-Wolf Exhibit Center. Los Angeles. 1989
 The Art Store. Los Angeles. 1987
 University of Wisconsin Fine Art Gallery. Milwaukee. 1987
 Arts Commission Gallery. Los Angeles. 1987
 Otis/Parsons Gallery. Los Angeles. 1984
 Amfac Plaza Gallery. Honolulu. 1984
 Herbert Johnson Museum. Ithaca, New York. 1983
 Columbia-Greene Community College. New York. 1983
 Arnot Art Museum. Elmira, New York. 1983
 Rockefeller Arts Center. Fredonia, New York. 1983
 Schenectedy Museum. New York. 1983
 At Home, Long Beach Museum. California. 1983
 Rutgers University Art Museum. New Brunswick, New Jersey . 1981
 Traction Gallery. Los Angeles. 1981
 Tompkins-Cortland Community College . New York . 1981
 Arnot Museum. Elmira, New York . 1981
 Zone Gallery. Springfield, Massachusetts. 1981
 Womanworks Gallery . Buffalo, New York. 1981
 Ithaca House Gallery . Ithaca, New York. 1981
 Los Angeles Institute of Contemporary Art. 1979
 Hinckley Foundation Museum . Ithaca, New York. 1979
 AART Gallery. Oakland, California. 1979
 State University of New York Art Gallery. Binghamton. 1978
 Cornell University Art Gallery. Ithaca, New York . 1978
 Lone Mountain College Art Gallery. San Francisco, California. 1977

Collections

New York 
 New York Public Library Special Collections
  Dr. Al Molvadan
 Meredith Tax
  Barbara Rochman
  Liza Norman
  Dr. Phyllis Silverman
 Janet Braun-Reinitz

Seattle 
 University of Washington Rare Book Collection

Jerusalem 
  Seth Althotz
  Dani and Deborah Kollin
  Rabbi Daniel Landes and Sheryl Robbin
  Timna Katz
  LSusan Schneider
  Eli and Miriam Avidan
  Drs. Jeff and Jane Kimchi
  Ephraim and Sigal Tabackman
  Rabbi Joel and Donna Zeff

Tel Aviv 
  Dan and Penny Witties
  Dr. Jim and Diane Breivis
  Drs. Cody and Lucy Fisher
  Annette and Steve Hess
  Sara Katz

San Diego, California
  Noa Summerfield
  Jean Diamond Sargent

Los Angeles 
  Midway Hospital Medical Center
  Hebrew Union College Skirball Museum
  UCLA Fine Arts Library
  Beverly Hills Fine Arts Library
  Uri Harkham
  Nancy Berman
  Robert J. Avrech
  James and Sonya Cummings
  Mark Carliner
  Michelle Rappaport
  Blossom Norman
  Dr. Robert and Peggy Sloves
  Phillip and Judith Miller
  Barbara Schuster
  Diane Isaacs Fink
  Abby Yasgar and Joey Lipner
 Adam Leipzig and Lori Zimmerman
  Drs. Suzanne and Moshe Spira
  Dr. Deborah Berger
  Drs. Donna Cooper-Matchett & Bill Matchett
  Lynn and Morton Moskowitz

Moscow 
  Artist's House, Chilushskinskaya

Berkeley, California
 UC Berkeley Fine Arts Library

Boca Raton, Florida
 Arthur Jaffe Center for Rare Books

Baltimore 
  John and Linda Haas

Ithaca, New York
  Tompkins County Hospital
  Fredrika and Bill Kaven
  Myra Malkin
  Catherine O'Neill
  Linda Myers
  Sandra Gittleman
  Robert and Corinne Stern
  Ira and Anne Brous
  Moorehead, Mn
  Minnesota State University

Faculty appointments, residencies and awards 
 Coolidge Colloquium Research Fellowship; 2010
 18th Street Arts Center, Santa Monica, CA; 2008, 2009
 Hebrew Union College, Los Angeles, CA; 2008
 Brandeis-Bardein College Institute (LA), Faculty; 1999-00
International Plein-Air Printmaking Grant, Chelushkinskaya, Russia (1996)
International Plein-Air Printmaking Residency Grant, Fargo ND (1998)
 International Plein-Air, Artist-in-Residence; Morehead, MN; 1998
 Brandeis-Bardein College Institute (LA), Faculty; 1997
 Chomut, Christina, TODAY'S LOCAL NEWS, "Space Visions", January 30, 2005
 International Plein-Air, Artist-in-Residence, Moscow; 1996
 Arad Arts Project (Israel), Artist-in-Residence; 1993–94
 Center for Jewish Culture and Creativity, Project Grant; 1993–94
 UCLA Extension, Instructor, Drawing/Painting/Book design; 1990–93
 University of Southern California (LA), Instructor, Painting/Design; 1984–89
 University of Judaism (LA), Instructor Painting/Drawing/Book Design; 1990–91
 Brandeis-Bardein College Institute (LA), Faculty; 1988–90
 Woman's Studio Workshop (NY), Artist-in-Residence/Project grant ; 1983 During this residency, Margolis created The underground dreams of cactus, an handmade artit's book in an edition of 20. The book documents a post-modern woman's experience. Sixteen etchings incorporating images and handwritten text explore the perils of living in a body-conscious, sex conscious world.
 Cornell Council on the Arts (NY), Project grant; Ithaca, 1983

References

External links
 Official web site
 Nashim: The Journal of Jewish Women's Studies and Gender Issues
 CommonGround2008
 Bright Idea Books
 "Women of the Book"
 "Judith Margolis:The Yatir Collection"
  Kalsman Institute on Judaism and Health

Feminist artists
American contemporary painters
American women painters
American women illustrators
American illustrators
University of San Francisco alumni
Columbia University alumni
University of Southern California alumni
20th-century American artists
20th-century American women artists
21st-century American artists
21st-century American women artists
Jewish American artists
Israeli artists
Israeli women artists
Jewish women painters
Jewish painters
Living people
1944 births
21st-century American Jews